Rue Saint-Honoré, dans l'après-midi. Effet de pluie ("Rue Saint-Honoré in the Afternoon. Effect of Rain") is an 1897 oil painting by Camille Pissarro. The work was made towards the end of Pissarro's career, when he abandoned his experiments with Pointillism and returned to a looser Impressionist style. Other paintings in the series depict a similar scene in morning sunlight, or in the shadows of the evening. The painting measures .

The painting has been displayed at the Museo Thyssen-Bornemisza in Madrid since the museum opened in 1992.  It had been bought by Baron Hans Heinrich Thyssen-Bornemisza at the Hahn Gallery in New York in 1976, from a US collector who bought it at the Knoedler Gallery in New York in 1952.  In 1993, the baron sold it with the rest of his collection of 775 works to the Spanish state for US$350 million.  A claim that the painting was Nazi looted art was dismissed by US courts in 2019 and 2020. However, in September 2021, the U.S. Supreme Court accepted certiorari to review that decision, and on 21 April 2022, the Court ruled in favor of Claude Cassirer as the rightful owner of the painting.

Provenance
The painting was bought from Pissarro by the German businessman Julius Cassirer in 1897, and it was inherited by his son Fritz Cassirer and then by Fritz's wife Lilly. In 1958, a German court awarded Lilly Cassirer Neubauer compensation of DM 120,000, the fair market value for the work.

In 2005, Lilly's grandson Claude Cassirer and other heirs filed a claim to recover the painting.  In January 2011 the Spanish government denied a request by the US ambassador to return the painting, and in 2015 a Spanish court ruled that the painting belonged to the museum.   In April 2019 the United States District Court for the Central District of California ruled that the painting belongs to Fundación Colección Thyssen-Bornemisza, on the basis that the baron and then the museum did not know it was looted art when they bought it.  While that decision was affirmed by the United States Court of Appeals for the Ninth Circuit in 2020, in September 2021, the U.S. Supreme Court accepted certiorari to review the Ninth Circuit's decision.  The case was heard on January 18, 2022 and on April 21, 2022, the Supreme Court, disagreeing with the decision of the Nith Circuit's decision, vacated the judgement.

See also
List of paintings by Camille Pissarro

References

 Camille Pissarro, Rue Saint-Honoré in the Afternoon. Effect of Rain, Museo Nacional Thyssen-Bornemisza, Madrid
 The US Court of Appeals rules that the Fundación Colección Thyssen-Bornemisza is the legitimate owner of the painting by Camille Pissarro, 18 August 2020
 "A Spanish Museum Can Keep a Nazi-Looted Camille Pissarro Painting Despite Family’s Objections, an Appeals Court Rules", artnet, 18 August 2020
 Thyssen-Bornemisza Prevails Over Cassirer Heirs' Claim to Pissarro Taken by Nazis Despite Acts “Inconsistent with the Washington Principles”, Sullivan Law, 2 May 2019 
 Ownership of Nazi-Plundered Pissarro Goes to Spanish Foundation, Institute of Art & Law, 14 May 2019
 "WikiLeaks Cables Make Appearance in a Tale of Sunken Treasure and Nazi Theft", New York Times, 6 January 2011
 Pissarro masterpiece travels a twisted history, Los Angeles Times, 7 April 2010

External links

1897 paintings
Rain in art
Paintings by Camille Pissarro
Paintings in the Thyssen-Bornemisza Museum